The following is a timeline of the history of the city of Volgograd, Russia.

Prior to 20th century

 1589 – Tsaritsyn founded.
 1606 - Tsaritsyn took part in the rising in favour of the False Dmitry I.
 1670 – Town taken by forces of Cossack Stenka Razin.
 1774 – Town taken by forces of Yemelyan Pugachev.
 1862 –  begins operating.
 1871 – Volgograd railway station rebuilt.
 1897
 Ural-Volga metallurgy factory established.
 Population: 55,914.
 1900
  established.
 Population: 67,650.

20th century

 1911 – Synagogue built.
 1913 – Population: 100,817.
 1917 – Tsaritsyn Soviet formed.
 1918 – Battle of Tsaritsyn begins.
 1925 – 10 April: City renamed "Stalingrad."
 1926 – Population: 151,490.
 1929 – Football Club Rotor Volgograd formed.
 1930 – Stalingrad tractor factory begins operating.
 1939 – Population: 445,476.
 1942 – 19 August: Battle of Stalingrad begins.
 1943 – 2 February: Battle of Stalingrad ends; Soviets in power.
 1951 – Barmaley Fountain dismantled.
 1952 – Volgograd Airport established.
 1957 – Premiere of Bulgakov's play Flight.
 1961
 10 November: City renamed "Volgograd."
 Volga Hydroelectric Station commissioned near city.
 1964
  opens.
 Central Stadium (Volgograd) built.
 1965 – Population: 700,000.
 1967 – The Motherland Calls monument unveiled.
 1980 – Volgograd State University founded.
 1984 – Volgograd Metrotram begins operating.
 1985
  opens.
 Population: 974,000.
 1987 –  founded.
 1989 – Football Club Olimpia Volgograd formed.
 1991 –  becomes mayor.
 1992 – Volgograd State Pedagogical University active.
 1996 – Nikolay Maksyuta becomes governor of Volgograd Oblast.
 2000 – City becomes part of the Southern Federal District.

21st century

 2003 – Volgograd Botanical Garden established.
 2007 – 20 May: Volgograd mayoral election, 2007 held; Roman Grebennikov wins.
 2008 – Football Club Volgograd formed.
 2009 – Volgograd Bridge opens.
 2010 – Population: 1,021,215.
 2013
 9 May: Murder of Vladislav Tornovoy.
 21 October: October 2013 Volgograd bus bombing.
 29–30 December: December 2013 Volgograd bombings
 2020 – 10 August: 2020 Volgograd explosion

See also
 Volgograd history
 
 Other names of Volgograd, e.g. Tsaritzin
 Timelines of other cities in the Southern Federal District of Russia: Krasnodar, Rostov-on-Don

References

This article incorporates information from the Russian Wikipedia.

Bibliography

External links
 Digital Public Library of America. Items related to Volgograd, various dates

Volgograd
Volgograd
Years in Russia